William White (1 October 1912 – 21 May 2011) was a British sports shooter. He competed in the 50 m pistol event at the 1952 Summer Olympics.

References

1912 births
2011 deaths
British male sport shooters
Olympic shooters of Great Britain
Shooters at the 1952 Summer Olympics
People from Hackney Central
Sportspeople from London